There are at least 93 named trails in Teton County, Wyoming according to the U.S. Geological Survey, Board of Geographic Names.  A trail is defined as: "Route for passage from one point to another; does not include roads or highways (jeep trail, path, ski trail)."
 Alaska Basin Trail, el.  
 Alaska Basin Trail, el.  
 Amphitheater Lake Trail, el.  
 Andy Stone Trail, el.  
 Arizona Creek Trail, el.  
 Atlantic Pacific Creek Trail, el.  
 Badger Creek Trail, el.  
 Bear Canyon Trail, el.  
 Beaver Creek Trail, el.  
 Bechler River Trail, el.  
 Berry Creek Trail, el.  
 Beula Lake Trail, el.  
 Big Game Ridge Cutoff Trail, el.  
 Bitch Creek Trail, el.  
 Boundary Creek Trail, el.  
 Bradley Lake Trail, el.  
 Camp Lake Trail, el.  
 Cascade Canyon Trail, el.  
 Clear Creek Trail, el.  
 Coulter Creek Tail, el.  
 Coulter Creek Trail, el.  
 Coulter-Wolverine Cutoff Trail, el.  
 De Lacy Creek Trail, el.  
 Death Canyon Trail, el.  
 DeCoster Trail, el.  
 Divide Trail, el.  
 Elephant Back Loop Trail, el.  
 Emma Matilda Lake Trail, el.  
 Enos Creek Cutoff Trail, el.  
 Enos Lake Trail, el.  
 Fairy Creek Trail, el.  
 Game Creek Trail, el.  
 Granite Canyon Trail, el.  
 Granite Highline Trail, el.  
 Green Mountain Trail, el.  
 Harebell Trail, el.  
 Hermitage Point Trail, el.  
 Hidden Falls Horse Trail, el.  
 Jenny Lake Moraine Horse Trail, el.  
 Jenny Lake Trail, el.  
 Lake Solitude Trail, el.  
 Lava Creek Trail, el.  
 Mallard Lake Trail, el.  
 Mary Mountain Trail, el.  
 Middle Fork Cut Off Trail, el.  
 Middle Pilgrim Trail, el.  
 Mink Creek Cutoff Trail, el.  
 Moss Lake Trail, el.  
 Mount Sheridan Trail, el.  
 North Bitch Creek Trail, el.  
 North Buffalo Trail, el.  
 North Fish Creek Trail, el.  
 North Leigh Creek Trail, el.  
 Old Fountain Trail, el.  
 Old Marysville Road, el.  
 Open Canyon Trail, el.  
 Owl Creek Trail, el.  
 Paintbrush Canyon Trail, el.  
 Paintbrush Divide Trail, el.  
 Pass Creek Trail, el.  
 Phillips Canyon Trail, el.  
 Pilgrim Creek Trail, el.  
 Pitchstone Plateau Trail, el.  
 Poacher Trail, el.  
 Purdy Basin Trail, el.  
 Rendezvous Mountain Trail, el.  
 Riddle Lake Trail, el.  
 Rodent Creek Trail, el.  
 Sheffield Creek Trail, el.  
 Shoshone Lake Trail, el.  
 Snake River Trail, el.  
 Soda Fork Trail, el.  
 South Boundary Trail, el.  
 South Entrance Trail, el.  
 South Leigh Creek Trail, el.  
 Spruce Creek Trail, el.  
 String Lake Trail, el.  
 Summit Lake Trail, el.  
 Taggart Lake Trail, el.  
 Taylor Mountain Trail, el.  
 Teton Crest Trail, el.  
 Trail Creek Trail, el.  
 Trail Creek Trail, el.  
 Trail Creek Trail, el.  
 Two Ocean Lake Trail, el.  
 Two Ocean Plateau Trail, el.  
 Union Falls Trail, el.  
 Valley Trail, el.  
 Valley Trail, el.  
 Valley Trail, el.  
 Webb Canyon Trail, el.  
 West Cutoff Trail, el.  
 West Pilgrim Trail, el.  
 Whetstone Creek Trail, el.

See also
 List of trails in Wyoming

Notes

Geography of Teton County, Wyoming
Historic trails and roads in Wyoming